Bahour is one of the 3 Firkas of Bahour taluk in Pondicherry (North) Revenue Sub-division of the Indian union territory of Puducherry.

Revenue villages
The following are the revenue villages under Bahour Firka

 Bahour
 Irulanchandai
 Kadavanur
 Karayambuthur
 Kuruvinatham
 Manamedu
 Panayadikuppam
 Parikalpet

See also
Netapakkam firka
Selliamedu firka

References

External links
 Department of Revenue and Disaster Management, Government of Puducherry

Geography of Puducherry
Puducherry district